Many sex clubs have operated in Portland, Oregon, United States. Businesses have included adult movie theaters, dungeons, gay bathhouses, and swingers' clubs.

Adult movie theaters
The Oregon Theatre and the Paris Theatre have operated as adult movie theaters.

Dungeons
Catalyst is a dungeon.

Gay bathhouses
Gay bathhouses have included Hawks PDX and Steam Portland. Club Portland closed in 2007.

Swingers' clubs
Swingers' clubs include Club Privata, Sanctuary, and Velvet Rope. Club Sesso operated from 2009 to 2015.

References

External links

 

Culture of Portland, Oregon
Sexuality in Oregon